Robin Tamang is a Nepalese singer, musician, actor and founder of rock band Robin and The New Revolution. He is also an actor, and has acted in various Nepalese films. He is well-known for playing the character of Yama Nadu in the Amazon Prime series, 'The Last Hour'.

Personal life 
Born in Singapore, Tamang was the youngest of five siblings born to a family that was active in the British Army. Due to his father being posted in various locations throughout his childhood, Tamang lived in Hong Kong, Singapore and Brunei during that time.

During his schooling in Singapore, he was inspired by Jimi Hendrix and Deep Purple. In the mid-1980s while he studied at Humber College in Toronto, he formed his second band Tamang and performed in various places.

In 1996, he returned to Nepal to live in Pokhara at his father's place, and joined the rock band Looza. After performing with them for some years, Looza eventually disbanded in 2005.

Albums
 Keta Keti, 2006
 Hamro Desh, 2010
  Nepal, 1998
 13000, 2001

Songs

References

21st-century Nepalese male singers
Nepalese male actors
People from Pokhara
Singaporean emigrants to Nepal
Living people
1963 births
20th-century Nepalese male singers
Tamang people